Famous, Rich and Hungry is a British factual television series that was first broadcast on BBC One on 12 March 2014. The two-part series is part of the Sport Relief 2014 season of programming. It shows Cheryl Fergison, Rachel Johnson, Jamie Laing and Theo Paphitis experiencing food poverty in the United Kingdom. The series has been called the celebrity version of Benefits Street.

Production
The series is produced by Love Productions and the executive producers are Richard McKerrow and Kieran Smith.

References

External links
 
 

2014 British television series debuts
2014 British television series endings
Television shows set in the United Kingdom
BBC television documentaries
English-language television shows
Comic Relief